XEOC-AM (branded as Radio Chapultepec) is a radio station owned by Grupo Radio Digital in Mexico City. It broadcasts a mixed talk and Tropical music format on 560 AM.

History
XEOC-AM signed on in 1958, owned by Federico Obregón Cruces and branded as Radio Chapultepec. For years it aired a format of jazz, blues, swing, R&B and other classic genre songs, similar to its competitor XENK-AM 620.

In late 2007 Óscar Obregón encountered financial problems and sold the station to Grupo Radio Digital, which rebranded it as La Nueva Pop airing a pop format. In 2008, the format was changed again, to talk radio.

On January 31, 2010, at 23:59 CST, Radio Chapultepec ceased broadcasting to start as La Mejor AM when Grupo Radio Digital and MVS entered into a joint alliance; the new station broadcast a Regional Mexican format previously heard on the latter's XHMVS-FM 102.5. However, the alliance between GRD and MVS ended on August 31, 2012, and the station returned as Radio Chapultepec.

External links

References

Radio stations in Mexico City
Radio stations established in 1958
1958 establishments in Mexico